Edward Charles MacIntosh Bowra (1841–1874) was a British citizen serving in the Chinese Maritime Customs working for the government of the Qing dynasty. He was among those treaty port residents who contributed to Western knowledge of China through translations and scientific work.

Career
As an amateur Sinologist and botanist he showed a range of scholarly and practical interests which reflected the then common view that a cultivated gentleman could master Oriental culture. He published a history of the province of Canton, and compiled Index Sinice et Latine for Justus Doolittle's Vocabulary and Handbook of the Chinese Language (1872), but his most widely known accomplishment was a pioneering translation of the first eight chapters of Dream of the Red Chamber in 1868.

Bowra was educated at the City of London College,  then served in the London Custom House before he went to Italy to join the British Legion in support of Red Shirts of Giuseppe Garibaldi in their campaign for Italian unity.

Service in China
In 1863 he was appointed clerk in the Chinese Maritime Customs, serving under Sir Robert Hart in Tientsin and Shanghai. He was sent in 1864 as a student interpreter to Peking, then appointed interpreter in Canton. Bowra organised the 1866 tour for the Chinese Secretary of Customs, Pin Chun. In England Bowra married Thirza Woodward. On his return to China he was sent to Ningbo, where his children Ethel and Cecil were born. He was promoted to Deputy Commissioner in 1872.He organized the Chinese contribution for the Vienna Exhibition of 1873, for which the Austrian government awarded him the Order of the Iron Crown.Bowra died in England at the age of thirty-two in 1874, apparently after over-exerting himself at a garden party. He was buried in the catacombs of West Norwood Cemetery.

His son, Cecil Arthur Verner Bowra (1869–1947) also served in the Chinese Maritime Service. His grandson, Maurice Bowra, born in Kiukiang, became a prominent classical scholar.

Notes

Further reading
 Charles Drage, Servants of the Dragon Throne: Being the Lives of Edward and Cecil Bowra (London: Peter Dawnay,  1966).

External links 
 Photograph Bowra's Farewell Tiffin
 The Bowra Papers (of Edward Charles Bowra and Cecil Arthur Verner Bowra) are held by SOAS Archives

1841 births
1874 deaths
British sinologists
Burials at West Norwood Cemetery